Midnight to Midnight is the fifth studio album by English rock band the Psychedelic Furs, released on 2 February 1987 by Columbia Records.

Midnight to Midnight was produced by Chris Kimsey, who was known for his work with the Rolling Stones and had recently produced Marillion's best-selling studio album Misplaced Childhood (1985). A more overtly commercial effort than the Psychedelic Furs had previously recorded, Midnight to Midnight was their highest-charting album in the UK, peaking at number 12, yet lead vocalist Richard Butler later characterized it as "hollow, vapid and weak", and the album has been described as "over-produced and underwhelming". The album also featured the single "Heartbreak Beat", which proved to be the Furs' biggest Top 40 entry in the US at that time. The album also featured drummer Paul Garisto and saxophonist Mars Williams, both of whom continued to tour with the band.

Track listing
All tracks composed and arranged by Richard Butler, John Ashton and Tim Butler, except where stated.

"Heartbreak Beat" – 5:10
"Shock" – 5:05
"Shadow in My Heart" – 4:07
"Angels Don't Cry" – 5:07
"Midnight to Midnight" – 4:30
"One More Word" – 5:17
"All of the Law" – 4:46
"Torture" – 3:50
"No Release" – 4:52
"Pretty in Pink" (1986 version) – 4:12 (Butler, Ashton, Butler, Morris, Kilburn, Ely)

The 1986 remake of "Pretty in Pink" only appears on the original UK/Euro cassette and CD issues.

Original US LP release
Side one
"Heartbreak Beat" – 5:10
"Shock" – 5:05
"Shadow in My Heart" – 4:07
"Angels Don't Cry" – 5:07

Side two
"Midnight to Midnight" – 4:30
"One More Word" – 5:17
"All of the Law" – 4:46
"Torture" – 3:50
"No Release" – 4:52

Personnel
The Psychedelic Furs
 Richard Butler – vocals
 John Ashton – guitar
 Tim Butler – bass guitar
 Mars Williams – horns; saxophone
 Paul Garisto – drums

Additional musicians
 Marty Williamson – second guitar 
 Jon Carin – keyboards
 Ed Buller – additional keyboards
 Steve Scales – percussion
 Frank Simms – backing vocals
 Pete Hewlett – backing vocals

Production and artwork
 Chris Kimsey – producing; mixing
 Michael Barbiero – mixing
 Nick Egan – art direction, design
 Michael Halsband – photography

Videos
Official music videos were produced for the singles "Heartbreak Beat," "Shock," and "Angels Don't Cry", with the latter directed by British filmmaker Tim Pope.

Chart performance
Album

References

External links
 

The Psychedelic Furs albums
1987 albums
Albums produced by Chris Kimsey
Columbia Records albums